High Noon (Highnoon on the title screen) is a western-themed shoot 'em up game written for the Commodore 64 and published by Ocean Software in 1984. Originally advertised on both the Commodore 64 and ZX Spectrum, the game itself was only ever released on the Commodore 64.

The game has five levels. The player takes the role of the good (white) sheriff in the American Old West. He must defend his town against outlaws looking to abduct women from the local "Saucy Sue's Saloon" and rob the local bank, by shooting them. Shooting can be done in a horizontal, vertical or diagonal direction.

The background music is the theme from the movie High Noon arranged by David Dunn.

Gameplay

The game consists of five levels. In each level, the difficulty is increased:
 Level 2 introduces outlaws on horseback
 Level 3 introduces outlaws planting sticks of dynamite
 Level 4 features outlaws hiding behind windows

After each level there is a bonus duel, featuring the sheriff and an outlaw, requiring a fast reaction time from the player. In level 1 through 4, an undertaker from "Rig+ Mortis Undertakers" collects any bodies lying around during the game.

Level 5 takes place in a different setting. The stage is set in a field surrounding a central cave opening, from which outlaws may appear. After surviving level 5, the game returns to level 1.

References

External links 

1984 video games
Cancelled ZX Spectrum games
Commodore 64 games
Commodore 64-only games
Ocean Software games
Video games about police officers
Video games set in the United States
Western (genre) video games
Video games developed in the United Kingdom